Young's End is a hamlet in the Braintree district of Essex, England. The population of the hamlet is included in the civil parish of Black Notley.

It is located along the former A131 road between Great Notley and Great Leighs.

Hamlets in Essex
Braintree District